The 1908 Penn State Nittany Lions football team represented the Pennsylvania State University in the 1908 college football season. The team was coached by Tom Fennell and played its home games on Beaver Field in State College, Pennsylvania.

Schedule

References

Penn State
Penn State Nittany Lions football seasons
Penn State Nittany Lions football